Anoplectanum is a genus of monopisthocotylean monogeneans in the family Diplectanidae.

Species
According to the World Register of Marine Species, the valid species included in the genus are:

 Anoplectanum haptorodynatum Boeger, Fehlauer & Marques, 2006
 Anoplectanum microsoma Boeger, Fehlauer & Marques, 2006

References

Diplectanidae
Monogenea genera